Dominic Hall, also known as St. Dominic House and the William L. Bailey House, is a historic house on the Providence College campus in Providence, Rhode Island.  It is a -story stone-faced structure with timber framing, and a prominent octagonal four-story tower at its southeastern corner.  The house was built in the 1850s by William Bailey, who had a  estate.  In the early 20th century the estate was acquired by the local Dominican Order, which used it as a convent and girls' school.  The property was then absorbed by Providence College (also a Dominican project).

The house was listed on the National Register of Historic Places in 1973.  It presently serves as the official residence of the college president.

See also
George M. Bradley House (aka Martin Hall), which stands nearby
National Register of Historic Places listings in Providence, Rhode Island

References

Houses on the National Register of Historic Places in Rhode Island
Houses in Providence, Rhode Island
Providence College
National Register of Historic Places in Providence, Rhode Island